The Beneteau First 260 Spirit is a French sailboat, that was designed by Group Finot and first built in 1994.

The First 260 Spirit was developed into the Beneteau First 25.7 in 2004, which became the Beneteau First 25S in 2008.

Production
The design was built by Beneteau in France, but is now out of production. During its production run 500 boats were completed.

Design
The First 260 Spirit is a recreational keelboat, built predominantly of fiberglass, with wood trim. It has a fractional sloop rig, a plumb stem, a reverse transom, dual transom-hung rudders controlled by a tiller and a centreboard. It displaces  and carries  of ballast.

The boat is fitted with a Nanni Industries diesel engine.

Operational history
The designer of the boat, Jean-Marie Finot, owned and sailed a First 260 Spirit for a number of years.

See also
List of sailing boat types

Related development
Beneteau First 25S
Beneteau First 25.7

Similar sailboats
Bayfield 25
Cal 25
C&C 25
Capri 25
Catalina 25
Catalina 250
Jouët 760
Kelt 7.6
Kirby 25
MacGregor 25
O'Day 25
Redline 25
Tanzer 25
US Yachts US 25

References

Keelboats
1990s sailboat type designs
Sailing yachts
Sailboat types built by Beneteau
Sailboat type designs by Groupe Finot